Jerry Vale (born Gennaro Louis Vitaliano; July 8, 1930 – May 18, 2014) was an American singer, songwriter and actor. During the 1950s and 1960s, he reached the top of the pop charts with his interpretations of romantic ballads, including a cover of Eddy Arnold hit "You Don't Know Me" (1956) and "Have You Looked into Your Heart" (1964). Vale, who was of Italian descent, sang numerous songs in Italian, many of which were used in soundtracks by films of Martin Scorsese.

Vale showed his love of Italian music with his albums, I Have But One Heart (1962) and Arrivederci, Roma (1963), full of Italian standards such as "Amore, Scusami", "Ciao, Ciao, Bambina", "Arrivederci, Roma", and "O Sole Mio". His renditions of "Volare", "Innamorata (Sweetheart)", and "Al di là" became classic Italian-American songs.

Early life
Vale was born Gennaro Louis Vitaliano in the Bronx, New York, to Italian immigrant parents, and grew up in the Wakefield section of the Bronx which at the time was composed mainly of Italian-American families. In high school, to earn money, Vale took a job shining shoes in a barbershop, singing while he worked. His boss, Vito Veneziano, liked the sound so well that he paid for music lessons for the boy. Vale started singing in high school musicals and at a local nightclub. Still a teenager, he left school to work in a factory as an oiler alongside his father.

Career
Vale's early nightclub performances led to additional shows in the early 1950s, including one lasting for three years at the Enchanted Room, a club in Yonkers, New York. When Paul Insetta (road manager for singer Guy Mitchell and hit songwriter) heard him there, he signed him to a management contract and further coached him. Insetta arranged for Vale to record some demonstration records of songs he'd written, and he brought them to Columbia Records. Guy Mitchell introduced Vale to Mitch Miller, then head of A&R at Columbia Records. Vale signed a recording contract, with Insetta as his manager for many years to come.

Jerry Vale appeared on the Ted Mack Amateur Hour in 1950 singing "It Isn't Fair".

Vale's first recording with the Columbia label, with accompaniment by Percy Faith and his band, was "You Can Never Give Me Back My Heart", reached No. 29 on the Billboard Hot 100 chart, becoming Vale's first U.S. hit.

His version of "The Star-Spangled Banner", recorded in late 1963, was a fixture at many sporting events for years, and the gold record Vale received was displayed at the National Baseball Hall of Fame in Cooperstown, New York. Vale frequently sang the song at Yankee Stadium. Additionally, he owned the Daytona Beach Admirals.

He sang the Late Night with David Letterman anthem "It's A Late Night World" on the program's eighth anniversary special in 1990. He made cameo appearances as himself in the 1990 film Goodfellas and the 1995 film Casino, both directed by Martin Scorsese.

Vale reportedly suffered a stroke in 2002 and did not perform in his later years.

Personal life
In 1959, Vale married Rita Grapel, a burlesque dancer. His biography A Singer's Life, by Richard Grudens, was published in 2000 by Celebrity Profiles.

Death
Jerry Vale died of natural causes in his sleep on May 18, 2014, at his home in Palm Desert, California. Vale was 83 years old. He and his wife had two children, Robert Vale and Pamela Vale Branch. He is interred at Forest Lawn Cemetery, in Cathedral City, California.

In popular culture
As an actor, Vale appeared as himself in the films Goodfellas and Casino as well as in television series such as The Sopranos, Midnight Caller, Who's The Boss and Growing Pains.

In the 2016 Disney animated film Zootopia, Nick Wilde finds a CD by "Jerry Vole".  Vale is portrayed by Steven Van Zandt in the 2019 film The Irishman.

Honors
In 1998, a Golden Palm Star on the Palm Springs Walk of Stars was dedicated to Vale.

Discography 
Jerry Vale discography

See also
 List of artists who reached number one on the U.S. Adult Contemporary chart

Notes

References
 
  (excerpt)

External links

Jerry Vale on Find A Grave
Jerry Vale Interview NAMM Oral History Library (1994)

Traditional pop music singers
American crooners
American people of Italian descent
People of Calabrian descent
People from the Bronx
People from Palm Desert, California
Singers from New York City
Burials at Forest Lawn Cemetery (Cathedral City)
1930 births
2014 deaths
Columbia Records artists
20th-century American singers
20th-century American male singers
Ballad musicians